The 2013 Copa de la Reina de Balonmano was the 34th edition of the Copa de la Reina de Balonmano. It took place mainly in O Porriño with two quarter-final matches taking place in A Guarda. The matches were held at Pavillón Municipal do Porriño, in O Porriño and Pavillón da Sangriña, in A Guarda, both in Province of Pontevedra Galicia, between 21 & 24 February 2013. It was hosted by Federación Galega de Balonmán, Xunta de Galicia, Deputación de Pontevedra & RFEBM. O Porriño and A Guarda hosted for first time the Copa de la Reina.

BM Bera Bera won its fourth title after defeating Ro'Casa ACE 25–24 in the final.

Qualified teams
The qualified teams were the top eight teams on standings at midseason.

Venues

Matches

Quarter-finals

In O Porriño

In A Guarda

Semifinals

Final

Top goalscorers

Source: own compilation

See also
2012–13 División de Honor de Balonmano Femenino

References

External links
Official website
Official guide

2013
Copa